Carol Sue Littleton,  (born October 23, 1942) is an American film editor.

Her work includes Body Heat (1981), E.T. the Extra-Terrestrial (1982), and  The Big Chill (1983). Littleton was the recipient of an Emmy Award for Outstanding Single Camera Picture Editing (for a TV Miniseries, Movie or a Special) for Tuesdays with Morrie (1999).

Littleton served as president of the Motion Picture Editors Guild from 1988 to 1991, and as vice president from 1994 to 2001, as well as from 2005 to 2007. Littleton has been elected as a member of the American Cinema Editors, and serves as ACE vice president since 2019. She is also a current member of the board of governors of the Academy of Motion Picture Arts and Sciences (Film Editors Branch).

Carol Littleton is married to cinematographer John Bailey.

Life and career
Carol Littleton was born 1942 in Oklahoma City but her family later moved to Miami in Northeastern Oklahoma, where she grew up. She attended the University of Oklahoma College of Arts & Sciences, obtaining her bachelor's degree in 1965 and her master's in 1970. Her obsession with film editing started in France, when Littleton became acquainted with French New Wave cinema. During the 1970s, Carol Littleton owned a production company that made commercials. She moved into working as a film editor with director Karen Arthur on Legacy (1975). Other films were to follow and  Littleton received an Academy Award nomination for editing Steven Spielberg's E.T. the Extra-Terrestrial (1982). Commencing with Body Heat (1981), Littleton had an extended collaboration with the director Lawrence Kasdan. Kasdan hired Littleton for Body Heat not only for her skill, but specifically because she was a woman. He believed only a woman editor could bring the eroticism he wanted in the film. Of the 11 films that Kasdan has directed, Littleton has edited nine.

In the late 1980s, Carol Littleton was elected and served as the president of the Motion Picture Editors Guild. Littleton is one of the major editors that author Gabriella Oldham interview for her book First Cut: Conversations with Film Editors (1992).

Filmography 
Unless noted otherwise, all productions below are feature-length fiction films that had a cinema release.

Accolades

Academy Award nominations 
1983 – E.T. the Extra-Terrestrial, nominated for Best Film Editing

Other awards and nominations 
 2000 – Tuesdays with Morrie, won for Emmy Award - Outstanding Single Camera Picture Editing for a Miniseries, Movie or a Special
 1999 – Beloved, nominated for Satellite Awards (International Press Academy) Golden Satellite Award - Best Motion Picture Film Editing (w/ co-editor Andy Keir)
 1983 – E.T. the Extra-Terrestrial, nominated for American Cinema Editors ACE Eddie - Best Edited Feature Film
 1983 – E.T. the Extra-Terrestrial, nominated for BAFTA Film Award - Best Film Editing

See also
List of film director and editor collaborations

References

External links
 
 Focus on Editing: Emmy Winner — Carol Littleton, A. C. E.)

1942 births
American Cinema Editors
American film editors
American women film editors
Living people
Artists from Oklahoma City
21st-century American women